William Henry Hughes (September 30, 1864 – November 11, 1903) was an American businessman and politician from New York.

Life
He was born on September 30, 1864, in Chapmanville, Venango County, Pennsylvania. He owned stone quarries in New York and Vermont, and was a wholesale dealer in slate.

Hughes was Quartermaster General of the State Militia from 1897 to 1898.

He was a member of the New York State Assembly (Washington Co.) in 1902 and 1903; and was Chairman of the Committee on Military Affairs in 1903.

On September 17, 1903, he filed schedules in bankruptcy. On November 3, 1903, he was re-elected to the State Assembly. He hung himself on November 11, 1903, at his home in Granville, New York; and was buried at the Elmwood Cemetery in Middle Granville.

Sources

External links

1864 births
1903 suicides
American politicians who committed suicide
People from Granville, New York
Republican Party members of the New York State Assembly
Suicides by hanging in New York (state)
People from Venango County, Pennsylvania
19th-century American politicians